Wanda & Joyce was a 1960s Netherlands based mother and daughter act made up of Wanda de Fretes and her mother Joyce Aubrey.

Background
Joyce Aubrey was the ex-wife of steel guitarist George de Fretes and Wanda was their daughter.
As an act they lasted from 1962 to 1964. They sang Hawaiian and krontjong songs. Originally from Indonesia, they were based in The Hague.".

Prior to teaming up with her daughter, Joyce Aubrey was a singer in the Mena Moeria Minstrels and the Amboina Serenaders. She also recorded as a solo artist with two singles on Fontana, "Heimwee naar Soerabaya" bw "Droomschilderij" in 1960, and "Carolina melodie" bw "Cowboy Jimmy Jo" in 1961. And Wanda de Frete's had released a version of "Let's twist again" on Decca.

Their first single "Ajoen Ajoen" bw "Koleh Koleh" was released on Fontana in September 1962. It did well for them. By November 1962, they had achieved a good level of popularity. Prior to that, Fontana has already released an EP with the songs "Ajoen ajoen", "Patokaän", "Rasa sajang keneh" and - "Koleh koleh". Their last single was "Dayung-dayung" which came out in 1964.

In later years Wanda de Fretes moved to California.

During their time recording together, they released nine singles and three extended play records.

Discography

References

External links
  Indo-Rock Gallery, Wanda & joyce

Dutch musical duos
Dutch-based Indonesian musical duos
Indonesian musical duos
Family musical groups
Female musical duos